Rodrigo Alejandro Sanhueza Godoy (born 21 October 1977) is a Chilean former professional footballer who played as a attacking midfielder for clubs in Chile and Indonesia. He also was a Chile international beach soccer player.

Club career
A product of Colo-Colo youth system, Sanhueza made appearances for the first team in 1997, 1998 and 1999. As an anecdote, he took part in the first derby against Universidad Católica played in the Estadio San Carlos de Apoquindo, alongside players such as Luis Mena, Pablo Contreras and Nicolás Córdova.

In Chile, he after played for Santiago Morning, Deportes Concepción and Deportes Temuco.

Abroad, he played in Indonesia for Persib Bandung in 2003 and Persigo Gorontalo in 2004.

International career
Following his retirement as a football player, he represented the Chile beach soccer team from 2008 to 2011. In 2009, he took part in the South American Championship, alongside retired professional footballers such as Cristian Olivares, Rodrigo Cuevas, Germán Osorio and Carlos Medina, with Miguel Ángel Gamboa as coach. In 2010, they won the Copa Latina after defeating Argentina, being named the best player of the tournament.

Personal life
As a beach soccer player, he was nicknamed El Acróbata (The Acrobat).

Honours
Colo-Colo
 Primera División de Chile (3): 1996, 1997 Clausura, 1998
 Copa Chile (1): 1996

Chile (beach soccer)
 Copa Latina (1): 2010

References

External links
 
 
 

1977 births
Living people
People from Temuco
Chilean footballers
Chilean expatriate footballers
Colo-Colo footballers
Santiago Morning footballers
Deportes Concepción (Chile) footballers
Persib Bandung players
Persigo Gorontalo players
Deportes Temuco footballers
Chilean Primera División players
Chilean expatriate sportspeople in Indonesia
Expatriate footballers in Indonesia
Association football midfielders